James Freedman is a British entertainer and stealth crime expert.

James Freedman may also refer to:
 James O. Freedman (1935–2006), president of Dartmouth College and the University of Iowa

See also
 James Friedman (pronounced Freedman), professor of law
 James W. Friedman (1936–2016), American economist
 James Freeman (disambiguation)